This is a list of notable Limbu people

Kings
 

 Budhhi Karna Raya Khewang- a king of Morang kingdom

Politics
 

 Bhim Hang Limboo - Indian politician from Sikkim
 Sanchaman Limboo - fourth Chief Minister of Sikkim, India
 Ram Bahadur Limboo - Indian politician from Sikkim
 Ganesh Kumar Limbu - Indian politician from   Assam                                                                     
 Govinda Subba -first governor of Province No. 1 Nepal                                                                          
 Parshuram Khapung -3rd governor of Province No. 1 Nepal
 Rajendra Prasad Lingden- Nepalese politician
 Bishnu Maden - Politician and leader of Rastrya Prajatantra Party, Former Minister
 Subash Chandra Nembang -former speaker of  House of Representatives lawyer, politician and leader of CPN(UML), Former Chairperson in Constitution Assembly, Nepal
Sukra Raj Sonyok (Songyokpa) - Chief Whip of Nepali Congress 2003-2005
 Indra Hang Subba - Indian politician
 Moni Kumar Subba, Indian M. P. Lok Sabha for Assam
 Narendra Kumar Subba - Indian politician from Sikkim
 Ram Bahadur Subba - Indian politician from Sikkim    
 Shiva Maya Tumbahamphe  -  former deputy speaker of the House of Representatives. and Minister of Law, Justice and Parliamentary Affairs Nepal

Education- historian, poet, professor 
 

 Iman Xin Chemjong (1904-1975 AD) - Limbu historian, author, writer on Limbu Kirant at the Tribhuwan University, first Kirat historian.
 Balkrishna Mabuhang - associate professor, writer
 Bairagi Kainla - Poet, former Chancellor of Nepal Academy and researcher into the folklore of the Limbu people.
Phalgunanda Lingden - prophet of Kirat Satyahang religion
Desh Subba -  author and poet
 Tanka Bahadur Subba, Former Vice Chancellor, Sikkim University.
 Upendra Subba - Poet
 Te-ongsi Sirijunga Xin Thebe (1704-1741 AD) - eighteenth century Limbu martyr and social worker, Kirat script reviver and teacher.

Music, film and media 
 

 Deepak Limbu - Singer, winner of "First Nepali Tara" competition
 Jhuma Limbu, Nepali folk musician and researcher
 Subin Limbu - Miss Nepal 2014
 Tara Prakash Limbu - singer, music composer
Abhaya Subba - rock singer, songwriter, composer, judge of first season of Voice of Nepal 
 Dinesh Subba - composer, singer and lyricist from Darjeeling
 Malvika Subba - Television and media personality, Miss Nepal 2002 and social activist.
 Nabin Subba - Film director
 Srijana Subba - film actress

Public service, government, army, and police
 

Captain Rambahadur Limbu  - Victoria Cross holder, Her Majesty's Armed Forces, United Kingdom
Tanka Bahadur Subba - Indian university administrator; vice chancellor of Sikkim University
Gyan Bahadur Yakthumba- 3rd IGP of Nepal police
Gajendra Bahadur Limbu- Retd. Major general of Nepal army, past principal military secretariat

Sports 
 

 Kiran Chemjong-  Nepali footballer who plays as a goalkeeper for Punjab and captains the Nepal national football team.
 Padam Limboo - Indian cricketer from Sikkim
 Anil Subba - Indian cricketer from Sikkim
 Bijay Subba - Indian cricketer from Sikkim
 Bhushan Subba - Indian cricketer from Sikkim

Limbu
Limbu people